Dehbaland ( or Деҳи Баланд,  Debalyan, Yaghnobi Дебаланд or Деҳбаланд) is a village in Sughd Region, northwestern Tajikistan. It is located the Yaghnob Valley. It is part of the jamoat Anzob in the Ayni District. Its population was 19 in 2017.

References

Populated places in Sughd Region
Yaghnob